John Briggs may refer to:

John Q. Briggs (1848–1921), American state senator in Minnesota (1907–1911)
John R. Briggs Jr. (1822–1872), American politician in Wisconsin
Johnny Briggs (cricketer) (1862–1902), English cricketer
Johnny Briggs (actor) (1935–2021), English actor who played Mike Baldwin in the British soap opera Coronation Street
Johnny Briggs (baseball) (born 1944), American former baseball outfielder
John Briggs (baseball) (1934–2018), American baseball pitcher
Jonny Briggs, eponymous character in a BBC children's television programme, first broadcast in 1985
Jon Briggs (born 1965), English voice actor and journalist
John Briggs (politician) (1930–2020), American politician
John Briggs (author) (born 1945), American author and university lecturer
John Briggs (bishop) (1789–1861), bishop and Vicar Apostolic of the Northern District of England
John Briggs, activist from Gainesville, Florida, and member of the Gainesville Eight group in the 1960s
John Joseph Briggs (1819–1876), English  writer
John Briggs (East India Company officer) (1785–1875), British officer in the army of the East India Company, and author
John Thomas Briggs (1781–1865), accountant-general of the Royal Navy